This is a list of MPs who lost their seat at the 2010 general election. In total, 74 MPs lost their seats.

Members of Parliament who lost their seats

References 

2010 United Kingdom general election
Lists of British MPs who were defeated by election